Ante Kotromanović (born 8 May 1968) is Croatian politician and army officer who served as Defense Minister of Croatia from December 2011 until January 2016.

Biography
Kotromanović was born in Potravlje near Hrvace. He graduated from Command and Staff Academy "Blago Zadro" and War College "Ban Josip Jelačić".

In 1990 he became a member of the special forces of the Croatian police. A year later, in 1991, he became commander of special forces company in headquarters of the Croatian Army. In 1992, he was named commander of a battalion in teaching center in Sinj. From 1993 till 1996 he was commander of the 126th Sinj Brigade and Sinj Operational Zone. From 1996 till 19 October 1999 he was commander of the 4th Guard Brigade. After that, he attended War College "Ban Josip Jelačić", and in 2001 he was named commander of the Dubrovnik Divisional District. In 2002 he retired from army service.

From 11 January 2008 until 22 December 2011 he was Member of sabor, after which he became Minister of Defence under Zoran Milanović as Prime Minister.

Decorations

References

1968 births
Living people
Defence ministers of Croatia
Representatives in the modern Croatian Parliament
Croatian army officers
Military personnel of the Croatian War of Independence
Order of Duke Domagoj recipients
Order of Nikola Šubić Zrinski recipients